

Chilla Well is a locality in the Northern Territory of Australia located about  south of the territory capital of Darwin and about  north-west of the municipal seat in Alice Springs.

The locality consists of the following land (from north to south) - part of the Central Desert Aboriginal Land Trust, the Mala Aboriginal Land Trust, the Yuendumu Aboriginal Land Trust and the Yunkanjini Aboriginal Land Trust. The locality fully surrounds the locality of Yuendumu and partially surrounds the Mount Doreen Station pastoral property to the west on the property's north, east and south sides. The Tanami Road passes through the locality from the south to the north-west via Mount Dooreen Station on its way to Halls Creek in Western Australia.

The locality’s boundaries and name were gazetted on 4 April 2007.  Its name is derived from the pastoral station of the same name, although there is a well located within the locality with the name "Chilla Well."

The 2016 Australian census which was conducted in August 2016 reports that Chilla Well had no people living within its boundaries.

Chilla Well is located within the federal division of Lingiari, the territory electoral division of Stuart and the local government area of the Central Desert Region.

References

Notes

Citations

Populated places in the Northern Territory
Central Desert Region